Heavy Drug (Surrender Sounds Mix) is an EP released by British electronic music group Unkle. According to James Lavelle, the track came about during a late night session, when he and his brother, Adian Lavelle, were working on serveal remix projects, which resulted in what they called a "happy accident". The track was reworked during the sessions for Where Did the Night Fall set for release in May 2010. A remix was made during the recording, entitled the Surrender Sounds Mix, which was featured on James Lavelle's Global Underground 037: Bangkok, and was officially released on 16 August. It was delayed in USA, due to distribution errors, and was finally released on 28 August 2009.

A follow-up, Heavy Drug (Surrender Sounds Mix): The Remixes, was released on 27 December 2009, with remixes from King Unique, Steve Mac and Future Beat Alliance.

A video contest for the song was officially revealed on UNKLE's blog.

Track listing

Original
 "Heavy Drug" (Surrender Sounds mix) – 8:19

Remixes
 "Heavy Drug" (King Unique Smoke Nest mix) – 9:29
 "Heavy Drug" (Steve Mac's Smacked Up mix) – 8:15
 "Heavy Drug" (Steve Mac's Smacked Up dub) – 7:07
 "Heavy Drug" (Future Beat Alliance remix) – 8:25

References

Unkle albums
2009 EPs
Remix EPs